WTND-LP (106.3 FM) is a low power community radio station licensed to Macomb, Illinois, United States, and serving Macomb and McDonough County.

External links
Official website
 

TND
Macomb, Illinois
Radio stations established in 2003